Ario Costa (born 26 September 1961) is an Italian retired basketball player of Basket Brescia, Victoria Libertas Pesaro and Fabriano Basket, and the current president of Victoria Libertas Pesaro since 2013.

Professional career

Player career
Ario Costa started his professional career with Basket Brescia in 1977. After many years in Brescia he went to Scavolini Pesaro where he became immediately a symbol for the team. With Pesaro he won two Italian League Scudetti, the first in 1988 and the other in 1990, and two Italian Cups, in 1985 and 1992.

He retired from the parquet at the end of the 90s.

The new role
Ario Costa has been engaged as general manager, at first in Pesaro, and later with Fabriano Basket. In 2006 he should go to Scafati, but disagreements with the president of the Campania team, he broke the contract prematurely. Subsequently he signed a contract as Sports Director for Lottomatica Roma.

On 18 June 2007 he became the new general manager of Eldo Napoli.

After the ouster of Eldo Napoli from Serie A, at the beginning of the 2008–09 season he became general manager of Juvi Basket Cremona, in Serie C Gold, and later of Triboldi Cremona, in Serie A.

During summer of 2010, Ario Costa became general manager of Basket Brescia Leonessa. In August 2012 he went to Fulgor Libertas Forlì.

In 2013 he returned to his team Victoria Libertas Pesaro as president of the club.

Honours

Team
Serie A champion (2): 1988, 1990
Italian Cup winner (2): 1985, 1992

References

External links
Victoria Libertas official website
Ario Costa at legabasket.it

1961 births
Living people
Centers (basketball)
Competitors at the 1983 Mediterranean Games
Fabriano Basket players
Italian men's basketball players
Lega Basket Serie A players
Mediterranean Games medalists in basketball
Mediterranean Games silver medalists for Italy
Victoria Libertas Pallacanestro players
1986 FIBA World Championship players